In geometry, the parabiaugmented dodecahedron is one of the Johnson solids. It can be seen as a dodecahedron with two pentagonal pyramids attached to opposite faces. When pyramids are attached to a dodecahedron in other ways, they may result in an augmented dodecahedron, a metabiaugmented dodecahedron, a triaugmented dodecahedron, or even a pentakis dodecahedron if the faces are made to be irregular.

The dual of this solid is the Gyroelongated pentagonal bifrustum.

External links
 

Johnson solids